Stanislav Olegovich Vovk (born 19 February 1991 in Moscow) is a former Russian tennis player.

Tennis career 
Vovk has a career high ATP singles ranking of 357 achieved on 7 July 2014. He also has a career high ATP doubles ranking of 387 achieved on 22 August 2011. Rudnev has won a total of 2 ITF singles titles on the futures circuit as well as 7 ITF doubles title.

Vovk made his ATP main draw debut at the 2009 St. Petersburg Open where he received entry to the main draw as a wildcard entrant into the singles event. He lost in the first round to Björn Phau, 3–6, 2–6.

Vovk is coached by this father, Oleg.

Vovk has retired from professional career in 2015.

Personal life 
Vovk's father, Oleg was a runner and his mother was a swimmer. Vovk can speak Russian, English and German. His family moved to the United States in 1997. He cites Frank Lampard as his most inspirational person.

External links 
 
 
 

1991 births
Living people
Russian male tennis players
Tennis players from Moscow